Harivamsa , a disciple of Gopala Bhatta Goswami, espoused a Vaishnava Theology which created the Radhavallabha Vaishnava sect of Hinduism.  Also, Harivamsa Goswami is known for his emotional poetry about Radha and Krishna. He was born around 1500 in the village of Bad, in Vrindavan. He was married at the age of 16 and had three sons. He renounced family life at the age of 32 and started for Vrindavana in modern-day Uttar Pradesh.

Vaishnavite religious leaders
15th-century philosophers
15th-century Indian poets
People from Mathura
Poets from Uttar Pradesh